Andrew "Andy" Carmichael ( – ) was an English professional rugby league footballer who played in the 1920s and 1930s  He played at club level for Hull Kingston Rovers (Heritage №), and Hull F.C. (Heritage №), as a , or , i.e. number 6, or 13, in the era of contested scrums, he was a director of  Hull F.C. from 1939 to 1946.

Background
Andrew Carmichael's birth was registered in Kingston upon Hull district, East Riding of Yorkshire, England, he was a fruit broker/importer on Humber Street, Kingston upon Hull –, he lived at 129 Porter Street, Kingston upon Hull , he lived at Willerby Road, Kingston upon Hull , and his death aged 61 was registered in Holderness district, East Riding of Yorkshire, England.

Playing career

Challenge Cup Final appearances
Andrew Carmichael played  in the Hull Kingston Rovers' 3–16 defeat by Oldham in the 1924–25 Challenge Cup Final during the 1924–25 season at Headingley Rugby Stadium, Leeds on Saturday 25 April 1925, in front of a crowd of 28,335.

Club career
Andrew Carmichael was transferred from Hull Kingston Rovers to Hull F.C. on 30 January 1929.

References

External links
 
Search for "Carmichael" at rugbyleagueproject.org
 (archived by web.archive.org) Stats → PastPlayers → C at hullfc.com
 (archived by web.archive.org) Statistics at hullfc.com
Search for "Andrew Carmichael" at britishnewspaperarchive.co.uk
Search for "Andy Carmichael" at britishnewspaperarchive.co.uk

1900s births
1963 deaths
English male boxers
English rugby league players
Hull F.C. players
Hull Kingston Rovers players
Middleweight boxers
Rugby league five-eighths
Rugby league locks
Rugby league players from Kingston upon Hull